Edmund Gerald Dease (6 September 1829 – 17 July 1904) was an Irish Home Rule League and Liberal politician.

He was elected Member of Parliament (MP) for Queen's County at a by-election in 1870 as a Liberal candidate, and won the seat again in 1874 as a Home Rule candidate. He then held the seat until he stood down in 1880.

Dease was educated at Queen's University of Ireland where he achieved a Master of Arts. Throughout his life, he was also a Deputy Lieutenant, Justice of the Peace, Commissioner of National Education, and member of the senate at Royal University of Ireland. His daughter was the Irish language prayer collector Charlotte Dease.

References

External links
 

UK MPs 1868–1874
UK MPs 1874–1880
1829 births
1904 deaths
Home Rule League MPs
Irish Liberal Party MPs
Members of the Parliament of the United Kingdom for Queen's County constituencies (1801–1922)